Ingpen is an English surname. Notable people with the surname include:

 Abel Ingpen, English entomologist 
 Joan Ingpen, English classical music talent agent
 Robert Ingpen, Australian illustrator
 Roger Edric Ingpen, (1867–1936), British founding partner in publishers Ingpen & Grant 

English-language surnames